Texmelucan Zapotec (Central Sola de Vega Zapotec) is an Oto-Manguean language of the San Lorenzo Texmelucan Municipality in western Oaxaca, Mexico (settlements of Benito Juárez, Ciénega del Río, El Arador, El Carrizal, El Ojo de Agua, El Palo de Lima, El Papayo (Río Papayo), El Ratón, El Suchil, Feliciano Martínez, La Calandria, Llano Verde, Llano Verde, Los Sabinos, Manantial de Agua, Naranjales, Piedra Blanca, Piedra de la Señora, Pueblo Nuevo, Rincón de Talea, Río Limar, Río Nube (El Platanar), Río Pescadito, Río Tambor, Río Tigre, Río de Talea, San José, Barrio de Totopostle, and San Lorenzo Texmelucan). It is a divergent Zapotec language, having only 10% intelligibility with its closest relative, Zaniza Zapotec. Both go by the name Papabuco.

Phonology 
Texmelucan Zapotec has been analyzed with twenty-five consonants /p, b, t, d, k, ky, kw, g, gy, gw, č, ǰ, s, z, š, ž, f, m, n, ñ, ŋ, l, ly, r, h/ (as seen in the chart below) and five vowels /i, e, a, o, u/. Interpreted IPA values are given in square brackets. Vowels may be oral or nasal, and may be plain, laryngealized (written as a doubled vowel), or glottalized (Vʔ).

Syllables may begin with up to two consonants and closed by up to one consonant.

Texmelucan Zapotec has four phonemic tones: high, falling, mid and low. On non-modal vowels, the number of possible tones is reduced: only mid and low tones are found on laryngealized vowels and only high and low tones are found on glottalized (or checked) syllables.

Semantics 
The semantics of the verbs 'go', 'come' and 'arrive' in Texmelucan Zapotec, as in other Zapotecan languages, relies on the notion of a deictic base. Each one of these words may be translated by one of a pair of verbs in Texmelucan Zapotec that differ based on whether the motion is toward or away from a deictic base. The deictic base is "is the place where the person in motion normally or expectedly returns", and when mentioned by Texmelucan Zapotec speakers, places like "my country", the town of San Lorenzo Texmelucan, and one's house are always treated as the deictic base. The table below summarizes the features of these six verbs. The cited forms are in the completive aspect and have a third-person masculine subject.

References

 Speck, Charles H. 1994. Texmelucan Zapotec verbs. Work Papers of the Summer Institute of Linguistics, University of North Dakota Session 38: 125-29
 Speck, Charles H. 1994. The existential use of positional verbs in Texmelucan Zapotec. Work Papers of the Summer Institute of Linguistics, University of North Dakota Session 38: 75-86.
 Speck, Charles H. & Velma B. Pickett. 1976. Some properties of the Texmelucan Zapotec verbs go, come, and arrive. International Journal of American Linguistics 42: 58-64.
 Speck, Charles H., compiler. 1998. Zapotec oral literature; El folklore de San Lorenzo Texmelucan. Dallas: Summer Institute of Linguistics.

Zapotec languages